The 1948 French Championships (now known as the French Open) was a tennis tournament that took place on the outdoor clay courts at the Stade Roland-Garros in Paris, France. The tournament ran from 19 May until 30 May. It was the 52nd staging of the French Championships, and the second Grand Slam tennis event of 1948. Frank Parker and Nelly Landry won the singles titles.

Finals

Men's singles

 Frank Parker defeated  Jaroslav Drobný 6–4, 7–5, 5–7, 8–6

Women's singles

 Nelly Landry defeated  Shirley Fry 6–2, 0–6, 6–0

Men's doubles
 Lennart Bergelin /   Jaroslav Drobný defeated  Harry Hopman /  Frank Sedgman  8–6, 6–1, 12–10

Women's doubles
 Doris Hart  /  Pat Canning Todd defeated  Shirley Fry /  Mary Arnold Prentiss 6–4, 6–2

Mixed doubles
 Pat Canning Todd /  Jaroslav Drobný defeated  Doris Hart  /  Frank Sedgman  6–3, 3–6, 6–3

References

External links
 French Open official website

French Championships
French Championships (tennis) by year
French Champ
French Championships
French Championships